The women's 4 × 100 metre freestyle relay event at the 2018 Commonwealth Games as part of the swimming program took place on 5 April at the Gold Coast Aquatic Centre. 20 athletes from 5 nations competed, with Australia setting a world record time of 3:30.05 in the final to win gold.

Records
Prior to this competition, the existing world and Commonwealth Games records were as follows.

The following records were established during the competition:

Results
The final was held at 21:50.

References

Women's 4 x 100 metre freestyle relay
Commonwealth Games
Common